The Western Pennsylvania School for the Deaf (WPSD) is a school for deaf and hard of hearing children in Edgewood, Pennsylvania. It was established in 1869. The school is listed as a Pittsburgh History and Landmarks Foundation Historic Landmark. The administrative building was built in 1903 by architects Alden & Harlow.

Affiliated organizations
 Alumni Association of Western Pennsylvania School for the Deaf

See also
Deaf Wrestlefest
Pennsylvania School for the Deaf

References

External links
 

1869 establishments in Pennsylvania
Educational institutions established in 1869
Pittsburgh History & Landmarks Foundation Historic Landmarks
School buildings completed in 1903
School buildings on the National Register of Historic Places in Pennsylvania
Schools for the deaf in the United States
National Register of Historic Places in Allegheny County, Pennsylvania